Bajram Sadrijaj (born 10 August 1986) is a Kosovar footballer who most recently played for FV Bosporus Thannhausen.

Club career
Born in Augsburg, he  played for TSG Thannhausen, FC Memmingen and Borussia Dortmund before he was forced to retire due to injuries sustained in a car crash in 2010. He returned to football in 2013 for his first professional club and later played for SC Bubesheim before joining Türkiyemspor Krumbach.

References

External links 

1986 births
Living people
Sportspeople from Augsburg
Footballers from Bavaria
German people of Albanian descent
Association football forwards
Kosovan footballers
TSG Thannhausen players
FC Memmingen players
Borussia Dortmund players
Borussia Dortmund II players
Bundesliga players
3. Liga players